The Maghrebi Republican Party or PRM is a Tunisian political party.

It was founded on 22 March 2011 by Mohamed Bouebdelli, head of the Free University of Tunis, as the Maghrebi Liberal Party and it changed its name to Maghrebi Republican Party on 13 April 2012.

References

2011 establishments in Tunisia
Liberal parties in Tunisia
Political parties established in 2011
Political parties in Tunisia